Sacha Silvestre Lima Castedo (born 17 August 1981 in Santa Ana del Yacuma) is a retired Bolivian football midfielder.

Club career
In 2000, Lima began playing professionally for Club Jorge Wilstermann. That year he helped the team win the national championship. In 2004, he was loaned to Real Potosí, but returned to Wilstermann the following year. During 2006, he was part of squad which crowned themselves as champions of the "segundo torneo". In 2008, he signed with The Strongest, but played there for one season since the board and the new manager agreed to rebuild the franchise and releasing nearly the entire roster, Lima included. In 2009, he joined Universitario de Sucre, team for which he also played in Copa Libertadores. From 2011 will be player in The Strongest.

International career
Since 2004, Lima has been called up to the Bolivia national team in 11 occasions. He was a member of the Bolivian squad during the Copa America 2007. He represented his country in 2 FIFA World Cup qualification matches.

Honours

Club
 Wilstermann
 Liga de Fútbol Profesional Boliviano: 2000, 2006 (ST)

References

External links
 
 
 
 

1981 births
Living people
People from Yacuma Province
Association football midfielders
Bolivian footballers
Bolivia international footballers
Bolivian Primera División players
C.D. Jorge Wilstermann players
Club Real Potosí players
The Strongest players
Universitario de Sucre footballers